Cosh Boy (released in the United States as The Slasher) is a 1953 British film noir directed by Lewis Gilbert and starring James Kenney and Joan Collins. It was made at Riverside Studios in Hammersmith.

Plot
Based on an original play by Bruce Walker, the film tells of the exploits of 16-year-old delinquent youth Roy Walsh (James Kenney) and his gang in post-World War II London.

The gang starts off by mugging women. Later, Roy becomes infatuated with Rene (Joan Collins), the sister of one of the gang members; but, already having a boyfriend, Brian, she rejects Roy, to his fury.  Later the gang beats up Brian.  Roy menaces Rene, who eventually submits to him. When she informs him that he has made her pregnant and urges him to marry her, he decides he wants nothing more to do with her.

Roy's mother, Elsie Walsh (Betty Ann Davies), is involved with Canadian Bob Stevens (Robert Ayres), who urges her to marry him so he can take Roy "in hand" before it's too late. Roy hates Bob.

Bob works as an assistant manager at the Palidrome dance hall, which becomes a target for the gang. Another member of staff appears on the scene whom Roy shoots and wounds (he initially believes he has killed the man).

Later that night a crowd of women arrive on the doorstep with Rene's mother, who adds that the police are on their way. Bob arrives, removes Rene's mother from the scene and decides to give Roy a thrashing - for his own good - before the police arrive in the belief that, if the judge hears he has already received a thrashing, his sentence might be lighter, which will be easier for his mother to stomach. The police arrive just as Bob is brandishing his belt in readiness. Bob lets them in, and in reply to their enquiry as to his identity he says he is the boy's stepfather, as "his mother and I were married this morning".

The senior officer congratulates him. Then, seeing the belt in Bob’s hand, he smiles, and suggests to his colleague that they go and arrest the other gang member first and come back for Roy later. Bob begins thrashing Roy as the scene cuts to outside and the mob of women listening to Roy's cries and shrieks for help. The detectives then walk away silently, into the night.

Cast
 James Kenney as Roy Walsh 
 Joan Collins as Rene Collins 
 Betty Ann Davies as Elsie Walsh 
 Robert Ayres as Bob Stevens 
 Hermione Baddeley as Mrs. Collins 
 Hermione Gingold as Queenie 
 Nancy Roberts as Gran Walsh 
 Laurence Naismith as Inspector Donaldson 
 Ian Whittaker as Alfie Collins 
 Stanley Escane as Pete 
 Michael McKeag as Brian 
 Sean Lynch as Darky 
 Johnny Briggs as Skinny Johnson 
 Edward Evans as Sergeant Woods 
 Cameron Hall as Mr. Beverley
 Sid James as Police Sergeant
 Frederick Piper as Mr Easter
 Anthony Oliver as Doctor
 Arthur Howard as Registrar (uncredited)
 Toke Townley as Mr. 'Smith (uncredited)
 Walter Hudd as Magistrate (uncredited)

Production
The film was based on a play, "Master Crook" by Bruce Walker which had been originally titled "Cosh Boy". It debuted at the Embassy in 1951 starring James Kenney.The Spectator said "its rough, crude taste is shockingly welcome" and praised the third act for its "highly unpleasant, undeniably effective, melodramatic tension." Variety called it "a strong piece of melodrama."

Joan Collins called it "a shop girl’s melodrama and the public loved it. I enjoyed working with Jimmy and all the other young actors. The director,  Lewis Gilbert, was adorable to me, and good to work with. "

Reception
Cosh Boy has also been named The Tough Guy, or The Slasher. It was called The Slasher in America because they were unfamiliar with the term "cosh".

It was among the first British films to receive the new X certificate.  It was given a Certificate rating of 16 in Norway (1953), and banned in Sweden.

The film's release coincided with the trial of Derek Bentley and some media linked the film to Bentley's crimes. "Today you'd show it to 10 year olds", Lewis Gilbert commented in 2000.

The film was banned in Birmingham. It was also refused permission to be shown in Australia.

Critical
Variety said the film was "bound to attract undue controversy" wherever it was screened and felt American audiences would have trouble understanding the accents.

The Monthly Film Bulletin said the film "can justly be accused of sensationalism. The characters are all stereotypes and in no way arouse the warmth of pity or indignation.... this film may provide plenty of ammunition to those who blame the screen for the incidence of juvenile delinquency. The awfulness of the crimes committed by the young thugs in the film is in no way emphasised and the excitement of conspiracy and chase is given a glamour which is in no way dimmed by the "nice" atmosphere of the youth club scenes and the puerility of the social workers, who can apparently be so easily duped. The performance of James Kenney and some good location work are the best points of the film... Joan Collins as the misused young girl is badly miscast."

The Los Angeles Times said the "acting... is tops."

Box Office
The film performed poorly at the box office.

Historical context
In England in the early 1950s, male youths in post-World War II delinquent gangs who wore stylised Edwardian-era fashion were initially known as 'cosh boys', and 'Edwardians', but later became better known as 'Teddy Boys' after a 23 September 1953 Daily Express newspaper headline shortened Edwardian to Teddy.

References

External links 
 
 
 Cosh Boy at BFI Screenonline

1953 films
1953 drama films
British drama films
Films directed by Lewis Gilbert
Films set in London
Films set in England
Films shot at Riverside Studios
Lippert Pictures films
British black-and-white films
British films based on plays
1950s English-language films
1950s British films